Adkinsia is an extinct genus of cephalopod belonging to the Ammonite subclass.

References

Ammonitida genera
Acanthoceratoidea
Late Cretaceous ammonites of North America
Cenomanian life